Porz is a borough or Stadtbezirk of Cologne, Germany. It is situated on the east side of the Rhine in the south-east of the city. Porz is the largest borough of Cologne by area at 78.92 km2 and has 113,500 inhabitants.

Porz borders with the Cologne boroughs of Kalk and Innenstadt to the North, Rheinisch-Bergischer Kreis and Rhein-Sieg-Kreis to the East and South, and the Rhine to the West. On the other riverbank lies the Cologne borough of Rodenkirchen.

History 
In 1951 the former independent town of Porz was awarded the town privileges. In the course of the local government reform in the 1970s in North Rhine-Westphalia, Porz was incorporated with Cologne.

Subdivisions 
Porz consists of 16 Stadtteile (city parts):

Economy
Organisations based in Porz include: The German Aerospace Center, TÜV Rheinland, The European Astronaut Centre of the European Space Agency and the Cologne-Bonn airport. Engine manufacturer Deutz AG has its headquarter and a R&D facility in Porz. The Executive Transport Wing of the German Air Force is based on the military part of the Cologne-Bonn airport and contributes to the local economy by the large number of soldiers stationed there. Since the beginning of the 20th century, Porz has been known for its glass manufacture.

Transport 

For car drivers, Porz can be reached from the Cologne Beltway via Bundesautobahn 59 and Bundesautobahn 559.

Rhine bridges 
  Südbrücke
  Rodenkirchener Autobahnbrücke

Public transport 
Porz is served by a number of railway stations. Regional train station include Porz (Rhein), Porz-Wahn, Köln-Steinstraße and Köln-Airport Business Park. Porz (proper) has two light-rail stations of Stadtbahn line 7: Porz Steinstraße to the north and Porz Markt in the town center.

Twin towns – sister cities

Porz is "twinned" with the following cities:

  Brive-la-Gaillarde, France 
  Dunstable, United Kingdom
  Hazebrouck, France

References

External links 

 Official webpage of the district 

 
Boroughs and quarters of Cologne